Osoje is a village in the municipality of Prijepolje, Serbia. According to the 2002 census, the village had a population of 526 people.

References

Populated places in Zlatibor District